Friends of Harry were an English pop folk group, who are best known for their song, "Take It All".

Formed in Newcastle in 1988 from the remains of two other Newcastle bands "Pop, Dick and Harry" and "The Bats".  They toured UK, Spain, Holland and Switzerland.  Their first (and only) album Six Days of Madness comprised early acoustic songs such as "Ronnie Lee" and "£27 a week" through the single "Take It All" to "Happy Life" and "Call of the Wild".  Both single and album were reviewed in Folk Roots magazine.   The group disbanded in 1992.

Members
 Chris Yeamans - Guitar, Vocals.
 Sav Scatola - Guitar.
 Zoe Lambert - Accordion, Vocals.
 Phyll Scammell - Bass, Vocals.
 Rob Brown - Drums, Vocals

Discography

UK albums

UK singles

Reviews
 "Take It All" - "The best record in the world at the moment" - Danny Baker GLR DJ (GLR single of the week)
 "A dozen good songs stuffed with tunes and social comment" - Time Out
 "A barrel of monkeys couldn't produce as much fun as Friends of Harry - they'll do you nothing but good" - Folk Roots

References

External links
 Interview with Chris Yeamans Cloudberry Records blog
 Licensing contact for Friends of Harry EP Music
  "Take It All" on YouTube

English folk musical groups
Musical quintets
Musical groups established in 1988
Musical groups from Newcastle upon Tyne